Tatjana Wood (née Tatjana Weintraub, in Darmstadt, Germany) is an American artist and comic book colorist.

Biography 
Tatjana's father was Jewish, and her mother was Christian. During World War II, she and her brother, Karl Joachim Weintraub, were sent to an international Quaker boarding school in the Netherlands. Gaining Dutch citizenship was not easy, so after World War II, the Quakers arranged for the two to travel to New York City in 1947. Karl went on to the University of Chicago, while Tatjana stayed in New York, attending the Traphagen School of Fashion. In 1949, she met Wally Wood, and they married August 28, 1950. The couple divorced in 1966.

During the 1950s and 1960s, she sometimes made uncredited contributions to Wood's artwork. One of the stories she worked on was "Carl Akeley" in EC Comics' Two-Fisted Tales #41 (February–March 1955). She did a number of animal drawings for that story.

Later, beginning in 1969, she did extensive work for DC Comics as a comic book colorist. She was the main colorist for DC's covers from 1973 through the mid-1980s. Wood did coloring work on the interiors of comics as well, including Grant Morrison's acclaimed run on Animal Man, Alan Moore's issues of Swamp Thing, and Camelot 3000. She won the Shazam Award for Best Colorist in 1971 and 1974. Tatjana has had no significant credits in the comics industry since 2003.

She is also a skilled dressmaker and weaver, who has crafted theatrical costumes and pictorial loom tapestries.

Tatjana's brother Karl died March 25, 2004. He was a distinguished scholar at the University of Chicago and the author of two books, Visions of Culture: Voltaire-Guizot-Burckhardt-Lamprecht-Huizinga-Ortega y Gassett (1966) and The Value of the Individual: Self and Circumstance in Autobiography (1978).

References

Sources
 Cartoonist PROfiles #15 (1972)
 "DC Profiles #49" at the Grand Comics Database. Originally published in Batman #317; The Flash #279; and Ghosts #82 (all November 1979)

Living people
20th-century American artists
American female comics artists
Comics colorists
EC Comics
German emigrants to the United States
Artists from Darmstadt
Traphagen School of Fashion alumni
Year of birth missing (living people)